Avila Beach (Spanish: Ávila) is an unincorporated community in San Luis Obispo County, California, United States, located on San Luis Obispo Bay about 160 miles (257 km) northwest of Los Angeles, and about  south of San Francisco. The population was 1,576 at the 2010 census. For statistical purposes, the United States Census Bureau has defined Avila Beach as a census-designated place (CDP).

History
The name Avila commemorates Miguel Ávila, who was granted Rancho San Miguelito in 1842. The town was established in the latter half of the 19th century, when it served as the main shipping port for San Luis Obispo. Around this time, Luigi Marre built a honeymoon hotel here and steamboats brought customers from San Francisco and Los Angeles.

Although Avila Beach still has a working commercial fishing pier and the inland areas have extensive apple orchards, tourism is now the main industry. There are few historical structures remaining; among the oldest is the Point San Luis Light, built in 1890 after a series of shipping accidents.  During World War II the beach and port were used for the Amphibious Training Base Morro Bay.

In the late 1990s, Unocal began the cleanup of decades old oil seepage discovered years earlier from corroding pipes under the township, and which had caused a massive oil spill under the town. Over 6,750 truckloads of contaminated material was sent to a Bakersfield landfill, and replaced with clean Guadalupe Dunes sand. Many of the town's homes and businesses, including several blocks of Front Street, were razed as a result of the quarter-mile-wide excavation. New buildings, homes, businesses, modern walkways and sea motif walls and benches have been constructed.

Geography
The beach is less than 0.5 miles (0.8 km) long and sheltered in San Luis Bay, which is formed by Point San Luis on the west and Fossil Point on the east.  Avila Beach faces south and the 600 foot elevation of Point San Luis breaks the prevailing northwesterly winds.  It is therefore usually warmer than the other beaches on the Central Coast.  Most of Avila Beach is undeveloped, except for a few blocks adjacent to the beach with homes, hotels, and small businesses, and a few upscale housing developments inland near a golf course. Avila Beach is also known for its hot springs, which are used for resort spas.

U.S. Route 101 and State Highway 1 bypass this part of the coastline to the east in favor of a more direct route from Pismo Beach north to San Luis Obispo.

According to the United States Census Bureau, the CDP covers an area of 6.0 square miles (15.6 km2), 99.71% of it land, and 0.29% of it water.

Climate 
Along with much of the California coast, winter is the wet season, with more than 70% of the yearly rain falling from December through March, while summer brings drought conditions.

Demographics

The 2010 United States Census reported that Avila Beach had a population of 1,627. The racial makeup of Avila Beach was 1,507 (92.6%) White, 13 (0.8%) African American, 7 (0.4%) Native American, 33 (2.0%) Asian, 0 (0.0%) Pacific Islander, 34 (2.1%) from other races, and 33 (2.0%) from two or more races. Hispanic or Latino of any race were 111 persons (6.8%).

The Census reported that 1,627 people (100% of the population) lived in households, 0 (0%) lived in non-institutionalized group quarters, and 0 (0%) were institutionalized.

There were 842 households, out of which 115 (13.7%) had children under the age of 18 living in them, 416 (49.4%) were opposite-sex married couples living together, 39 (4.6%) had a female householder with no husband present, 16 (1.9%) had a male householder with no wife present.  There were 36 (4.3%) unmarried opposite-sex partnerships, and 14 (1.7%) same-sex married couples or partnerships. 296 households (35.2%) were made up of individuals, and 108 (12.8%) had someone living alone who was 65 years of age or older. The average household size was 1.93.  There were 471 families (55.9% of all households); the average family size was 2.45.

The population was spread out, with 183 people (11.2%) under the age of 18, 74 people (4.5%) aged 18 to 24, 263 people (16.2%) aged 25 to 44, 597 people (36.7%) aged 45 to 64, and 510 people (31.3%) who were 65 years of age or older.  The median age was 56.9 years. For every 100 females, there were 91.4 males.  For every 100 females age 18 and over, there were 92.0 males.

The homeowner vacancy rate was 3.1%; the rental vacancy rate was 7.4%.  1,074 people (66.0% of the population) lived in owner-occupied housing units and 553 people (34.0%) lived in rental housing units.

Points of interest

Avila Beach has three piers: Avila Beach Pier,  in length, is open to tourist strolling and recreational fishing; Harford Pier, which is for commercial fishing boats to offload their wares since 1873; and the California Polytechnic State University (Cal Poly SLO) Pier, part of the university's marine research program, is not publicly accessible.

In recent years, the pier has become a site for whale watching as numbers of grays and humpback whales come into bays around the pier to feed and draw crowds during the seasons.

In 2016, the owner of the plant, PG&E decided to allow the licenses for two reactors to expire in 2024 and 2025, which would close the power plant.

The Avila Beach Pier was featured in a Super Bowl advertisement on February 7, 2010.

Avila Beach was the primary shooting location for the 1979 film California Dreaming, which starred Dennis Christopher, Glynnis O'Connor, and Seymour Cassel.

Gallery

See also
List of beaches in California
List of California state parks

References

External links 

Avila Beach Community Services District
Port San Luis Harbor
The Point San Luis Lighthouse Point San Luis Lighthouse Keepers
Central Coast Aquarium - Avila Beach

Populated coastal places in California
Census-designated places in San Luis Obispo County, California
Spa towns in California
Hot springs of California
Census-designated places in California
Beaches of San Luis Obispo County, California
Beaches of Southern California